Bossuyt may refer to:
 Anneleen Van Bossuyt (born 1980), a Belgian Member of the European Parliament
 Gilbert Bossuyt (born 1947), a Belgian politician
 Marc Bossuyt (born 1944), a member of the Permanent Court of Arbitration in The Hague
 Tine Bossuyt (born 1980), a retired Belgian swimmer

Surnames of Belgian origin